Arthur Pusey (July 1896 – 1965) was a British stage and film actor.

He was born in Watford, Hertfordshire, and died in London.

Selected filmography
 The Barton Mystery (1920)
 The Bachelor's Club (1921)
 The Other Person (1921)
 The God in the Garden (1921)
 Stable Companions (1922)
 The Lonely Lady of Grosvenor Square (1922)
 The Blue Lagoon (1923)
 Moonbeam Magic (1924)
 Father Voss (1925)
 Land of Hope and Glory (1927)
 Weib in Flammen (1928)
 The Woman on the Rack (1928)
 The Silent House (1929)
 Die vierte von rechts (1929)
 The Fourth from the Right (1929)
 To What Red Hell (1929)
 Red Pearls (1930)

Bibliography
 Jung, Uli & Schatzberg, Walter. Beyond Caligari: The Films of Robert Wiene. Berghahn Books, 1999.

External links

1896 births
1965 deaths
English male film actors
English male silent film actors
20th-century English male actors
20th-century British male actors
People from Watford